Foras Feasa ar Éirinn – literally 'Foundation of Knowledge on Ireland', but most often known in English as 'The History of Ireland' – is a narrative history of Ireland by Geoffrey Keating, written in Irish and completed .

Outline

It begins with a preface in which Keating defends the honour of Ireland against the denigrations of writers such as Giraldus Cambrensis, followed by a narrative history in two parts: part one, from the creation of the world to the arrival of Christianity in the 5th century, and part two, from the 5th century to the coming of the Normans during the 12th century.

It depicts Ireland as an autonomous, unitary kingdom of great antiquity. The early part of the work is largely mythical, depicting the history of Ireland as a succession of invasions and settlements, and derives primarily from medieval writings such as the Lebor Gabála Érenn, the Dindsenchas, royal genealogies and stories of heroic kings. The later part depicts the Normans as the latest of this series of settlers. Keating, a Catholic priest of Hiberno-Norman ancestry, gave Irish people of both Gaelic and Norman ancestry credit for the development of the nation, and emphasised the role of the Church as a unifying factor in Irish culture.

The work was extremely popular, surviving in a large number of manuscripts, and its prose style became the standard followed by generations of Irish-language writers. However, it was received critically from the start, with Sir Richard Cox (1650..1733), a protestant lawyer of English descent, describing it in the 1680s as "an ill-digested heap of very silly fictions". Modern scholars consider in the context of the antiquarian tendency of Renaissance humanism, with Keating expounding on ancient Irish sources, whose authority he defends, to provide "an origin-legend for Counter-Reformation Catholic Ireland."

See also

 Annals of the Four Masters
 Leabhar na nGenealach
 Ó Cléirigh Book of Genealogies

References

Editions and translation
 For a fuller list of translations and editions, see:

Manuscripts

External links

1634 books
17th-century history books
Royal Irish Academy Library
Early Irish literature
Irish-language literature
Mythological cycle
Cycles of the Kings
Irish chronicles
17th-century Irish literature
Irish manuscripts
Irish books